Trübtensee or Triebtenseewli is a lake in the municipality of Guttannen, Bernese Oberland, Switzerland. Its dam was completed in the 1950s and holds a volume of 1.1 mio m³.

External links
Lake Trübten

Reservoirs in Switzerland
Bernese Oberland
Lakes of the canton of Bern
RTrubtensee